Stary Otok  is a village in the administrative district of Gmina Oława, in Oława County, Lower Silesian Voivodeship, south-western Poland. Prior to 1945 it was in Germany.

References

Stary Otok